Danit Brown is an American short story writer.

Life
She graduated from Oberlin College, and Indiana University Bloomington with a Master of Fine Arts. 
She teaches at Albion College.

Her work has appeared Story, Glimmer Train, StoryQuarterly, and One Story.

She lives in Michigan with her family.

Awards
2009 American Book Award

Works

References

External links
 "Danit Brown", Writers Read, August 9, 2008
 Personal site

Year of birth missing (living people)
Living people
American short story writers
Oberlin College alumni
Indiana University Bloomington alumni
Albion College faculty
American Book Award winners